Barom Reachea IV or Barom Reachea VII (1548–1619), also known as Srei Soriyopear (also spelled Soryopor or Soryapor), was the Cambodian king who ruled from 1603 to 1618.

He was appointed the ouparach (heir apparent or viceroy) by his elder brother Satha I in 1579.

During  Satha I he was order to help Siamese and fight against Burmese in order to help siamese restore Ayutthaya.
In 1594, when Cambodia was attacked by Siam, Chey Chettha I and Satha I fled the capital, leaving Soriyopear to defend against the Siamese. Soriyopear was granted the title Uprayorach (ឧភយោរាជ), the title usually borne by kings who had abdicated but retained executive powers. He was assisted by Spanish and Portuguese mercenaries, but in the same year Lovek was captured by Siamese, he was taken to Ayutthaya along with 90,000 Cambodians.He is the father of the princess Ek Kasattri one of the consorts of King Naresuan of Ayutthaya. 

Srei Soriyopear was released and returned to Cambodia in 1600.  With the help of the Siamese, his nephew Kaev Hua I (Ponhea Nhom) was forced to abdicate the throne in favor of him. Cambodia became a vassal of Siam. He succeeded to the throne with the powerful support of the influential queen mother Devikshatri.

Soriyopear built the new capital Oudong in 1601. He died in 1619, succeeded by his eldest son Chey Chettha II.

See also
Siamese–Cambodian War (1591–1594)

References

1548 births
1619 deaths
17th-century Cambodian monarchs